Weick is a surname. Notable people with the surname include:

Ann Weick (1941–2014), American academic in social work
Bill Weick, American sport wrestler and coach
Christine Weick (born 1964), American Christian activist and writer
Fred Weick (1899–1993), American aviator and aircraft designer
Karl E. Weick (born 1936), American organizational theorist
Paul Charles Weick (1899–1997), American judge